The Seti River is an important tributary of the Karnali system that drains western Nepal.

Course
The Seti originates from the snow fields and glaciers around the twin peaks of Api and Nampa in the south facing slopes of the main Himalayas. The area is near the trijunction of the borders of Nepal, India (Kumaon, Uttarakhand), and China (Tibet). The river first flows in a south-easterly direction, then turns and flows in a south-westerly and finally south-easterly again before joining the Karnali or Ghagra River. It has cut a spectacular gorge across the Mahabharat Range and appears to be lost amongst caves and tunnels for a short distance.

References 

Rivers of Sudurpashchim Province
Ghaghara